Olivia Chow (born March 24, 1957) is a Canadian retired politician who was a federal New Democratic Party (NDP) member of Parliament (MP) representing Trinity—Spadina from 2006 to 2014. Chow ran in the 2014 Toronto mayoral election, placing third behind winner John Tory and runner-up Doug Ford, and served on the Metro Toronto Council from 1991 to the 1998 amalgamation and subsequently on Toronto City Council until 2005, when she ran for MP.

Chow is the widow of former Official Opposition and NDP leader Jack Layton. They were married from 1988 until his death from cancer in 2011.

Chow was elected to represent Trinity—Spadina in the House of Commons on January 23, 2006, as a member of the NDP. In 2011, she was re-elected in her riding for her third straight win. Chow resigned her seat in Parliament on March 12, 2014, to run for mayor of Toronto. Following her mayoral election loss, Chow became a distinguished visiting professor at Ryerson University (now Toronto Metropolitan University) from 2015 to 2018. In the 2015 Canadian federal election, she unsuccessfully ran for MP for Spadina—Fort York, losing the seat to the Liberal candidate, Adam Vaughan.

Chow speaks Cantonese, Mandarin and English. In May 2012, Chow was one of the recipients of the Top 25 Canadian Immigrant Awards presented by Canadian Immigrant magazine. Chow's personal memoir, titled My Journey, was published January 21, 2014.

Personal life

Chow was born in British Hong Kong, to Ho Sze, a schoolteacher, and Wilson Wai Sun Chow, a school superintendent. She was raised in a middle-class family in Happy Valley, a residential area in Hong Kong. She immigrated to Canada with her family in 1970 at the age of 13 and lived in a high-rise unit in St. James Town, a neighbourhood in Toronto. Her father worked odd jobs, such as delivering Chinese food and driving taxis to support the family. Her mother became a seamstress and a maid, and worked in a hotel laundry. Her father was physically abusive towards her half-brother, Andre, and her mother, but nurturing and loving towards Olivia.

Chow was raised in a Chinese Baptist household. As a young girl she was a slow learner and had to repeat grade 3. However, she soon started to excel and she later skipped grade 8. She attended Jarvis Collegiate Institute and studied fine arts at the Ontario College of Art, and philosophy and religion at the University of Toronto. In 1979, she graduated with an honours bachelor of arts in fine art from the University of Guelph.

After graduation, she worked as an artist. She owned a sculpture studio and created art pieces for clients. She still paints occasionally. She later taught at George Brown College's Assaulted Women and Children Counselling and Advocacy Program for five years.

In 2005, she revealed that she had undergone surgery for thyroid cancer in 2004. She decided to speak out to raise awareness of the disease. In 2013, she was diagnosed with Ramsay Hunt syndrome type II.

She married Jack Layton in 1988 and they stayed together until his death in August 2011. On August 20, 2012, she unveiled a statue dedicated to Layton; tributes to him were written in English, Chinese and French. The statue is located in Harbour Square Park at the Jack Layton Ferry Terminal. Chow is portrayed by Sook-Yin Lee in the 2013 CBC Television film Jack. Lee won a Canadian Screen Award for her performance.

Municipal politics
Chow first became active in politics working with local NDP MP Dan Heap. With his support, she ran for school board trustee, and won in 1985. Popular on the school board, she was elected to Metropolitan Toronto Council in the 1991 election for the Metro Toronto ward of Downtown (this ward was abolished in the 1997 amalgamation). The area has long been home to a diverse group of communities in the core of Canada's largest urban centre. Chow was re-elected several times to city council by wide margins.

As councillor, Chow was an advocate for the homeless, public transit, and many other urban issues that promote sustainable development. She was also a vociferous opponent of the proposed Toronto Island Airport expansion, a controversial plan by the Toronto Port Authority .

Following the amalgamation of Metropolitan Toronto, she and her husband Jack Layton were prominent members of the city council. While sometimes critical of pro-development Mayor Mel Lastman and other suburban councillors, they worked with councillors across political lines to achieve practical progressive measures. Layton left his seat on council to become federal leader of the NDP. Both were supporters of David Miller's successful 2003 campaign to become mayor of Toronto.

Chow was forced to resign her position on the Toronto Police Services Board because, at a riot in front of the Legislative Assembly of Ontario, she informally attempted to persuade police to change their tactics. Some argued, however, that she was ousted for her outspoken attitude towards alleged police misconduct.

Chow was renowned for her trademark bicycle, decorated with flowers and bright colours, which she rode every day to Toronto City Hall.

Chow was voted "Best City Councillor" on numerous occasions by Toronto's alternative weeklies Now Magazine and Eye Weekly. In May 2012, Chow was named one of the top 25 Canadian immigrants in Canada by the Canadian Immigrant magazine.

Federal politics
In 1997, Chow ran as an NDP candidate for the House of Commons in Trinity—Spadina. Liberal incumbent Tony Ianno won by 1,802 votes, 4.5% of the total.

In 2004, Chow again won the Trinity—Spadina NDP nomination for the summer federal election. With support from Jack Layton, a new urban focus of the NDP, and higher party popularity nationwide, she was widely expected to win despite some criticism from voters who elected her to a municipal seat just six months prior. She managed another strong second-place showing, but failed to unseat Ianno by only 805 votes, 1.5% of the total.

Tactical voting was blamed partially for Chow's defeat, as Liberal attack ads on Conservative Party leader Stephen Harper attempted to make the election a choice between the Liberals and Conservatives, with the effect of attracting NDP-leaning voters to support the Liberals and stave off a potential Harper government. Chow also did not resign her council seat to run federally, with some suggesting that her constituents felt comfortable voting Liberal while still having Chow around to represent them at a different level of government.

When the Liberal federal government was defeated on a motion of non-confidence, Chow resigned her city council seat of fourteen years on November 28, 2005, to make a third run at seat in the House of Commons. She was succeeded on city council on an interim basis by Martin Silva. As Silva was not allowed to run for re-election, Chow's constituency assistant Helen Kennedy ran but lost to Adam Vaughan.

During the 2006 campaign, Mike Klander, an executive of the federal Liberal party's Ontario wing, made comments in his blog insinuating that Chow was a Chow Chow dog and said of her husband, "I just want to say that I think Jack Layton is an asshole". Layton denounced the comments about Chow as racist, and Klander apologized and resigned.

On January 23, 2006, she won the Trinity—Spadina seat for the NDP in the federal election. She defeated Ianno by 3,667 votes, almost 6%. Along with Jack Layton she was part of only the second husband-and-wife team in Canadian parliamentary history to serve jointly. (Gurmant Grewal and Nina Grewal were the first, winning their seats in the 2004 election.)

In 2007, Chow sponsored a motion calling for Japan to apologize for forcing some 200,000 women to serve as wartime sex slaves. The motion was passed unanimously by Canada's parliament in November 2007. Chow said, "For me, this isn't crimes against 200,000 women. It's crimes against humanity and all of the world's citizens have a responsibility to speak out against it."

On June 3, 2008, Chow, "who [originally] brought in the motion", voted to implement a program which would "allow conscientious objectors... to a war not sanctioned by the United Nations... to... remain in Canada". The motion gained international attention from The New York Times, the BBC and the New Zealand press. The Toronto Star reported: "[It] passed 137 to 110 ... But the motion is non-binding and the victory was bittersweet as the government (Conservative Party of Canada) is likely to ignore it." After Prime Minister Harper sought and received permission to seek a new mandate in 2008, Chow would reintroduce the same motion in the 40th Canadian Parliament. The House passed it on March 30, 2009, with a vote of 129–125. Chow was instrumental in debates and actions surrounding Canada and Iraq War resisters.

In the 2011 Canadian federal election, which saw the NDP's historic rise to Official Opposition, Chow was re-elected handily in Trinity—Spadina with a margin of more than 20,000 votes over her nearest rival. She was named critic for transport, infrastructure and communities in the Official Opposition Shadow Cabinet. She also became the first spouse of a leader of the Opposition to be an MP as well.

However, her time in Stornoway was to be short, as Jack Layton died of cancer just three months after assuming office. Chow was in the spotlight as Layton's widow during the mourning period and state funeral, winning respect for her care for her husband in his last days and for her dignity and poise in grief, and her personal and political partnerships with Layton were eulogized. Subsequently, she ruled out a bid for the leadership of the NDP and pledged neutrality in the leadership race.

On March 12, 2014, Chow resigned her seat and registered to run in the 2014 mayoral race in Toronto.

2015 attempted return
Chow announced on July 28, 2015, that she was seeking the federal NDP nomination in Spadina—Fort York for the 2015 federal election. The new riding comprises much of the former Trinity—Spadina riding. She faced Liberal MP Adam Vaughan, who was elected MP for Trinity—Spadina in 2014 in a by-election that was held following Chow's resignation to run for mayor. Chow lost to Vaughan by a wide margin amid a Liberal sweep of Toronto ridings.

2014 Toronto mayoral election

Chow entered the 2014 mayoral campaign in an attempt to unseat incumbent Rob Ford after most polls taken over the previous year suggested she was best placed to win either a head-to-head vote against Ford or a multi-candidate contest. Ford's mayoralty had been at the centre of several controversies during his tenure, most significantly over accusations and ultimately Ford's own admission that he had used crack cocaine as well as allegations that he has associated with criminals. Chow was the only prominent centre-left candidate running against Ford. Her other major rivals in the election, former provincial Opposition leader John Tory, councillor Karen Stintz and former budget chief David Soknacki as well as Ford himself, were all centre-right candidates.

Chow's campaign manager was John Laschinger, who previously managed David Miller's mayoral campaigns as well as federal and provincial Conservative campaigns. Former federal and provincial Liberal strategist Warren Kinsella also worked on her campaign. Other senior staff included former MuchMusic VJ Jennifer Hollett, former NDP national director Nathan Rotman, and Brian Topp, a former NDP leadership candidate. Supporters included former Ontario Liberal cabinet minister George Smitherman (who was the runner-up to Ford in the 2010 mayoral election) and filmmaker Deepa Mehta.

Chow's three priority areas were transit, children and jobs. She came out against subway expansion in favour of more buses, and building LRTs lines on Toronto's roads. She also released policies about expanding after-school recreation programs for children aged 6–11, as well as creating 5,000 jobs and training opportunities for young people through community benefits agreements.

Over the course of the election, Chow went from the polling favourite at the beginning of the campaign to eventually placing third in the election. Polls suggested she failed to capitalize on her early popularity and fell victim to strategic voting.

Academic appointment
Following her loss in the municipal election, Chow was appointed to a three-year term, beginning March 1, 2015, as distinguished visiting professor in Ryerson's Faculty of Arts, with a focus on community engagement and democratic participation. On July 28, Ryerson University released a statement that it had agreed to grant Chow's request for a leave of absence from the university.

Electoral record

See also 

 Layton family

References

Further reading

External links

imwitholivia.ca Web Archive - 2014 Toronto Mayoral Collection - created by the University of Toronto Libraries 
oliviachow.ca Web Archive - 2014 Toronto Mayoral Collection - created by the University of Toronto Libraries 
stopchownow.ca Web Archive - 2014 Toronto Mayoral Collection - created by the University of Toronto Libraries

1957 births
21st-century Canadian non-fiction writers
21st-century Canadian women writers
Artists from Toronto
Canadian memoirists
Canadian sculptors
Canadian women artists
Women municipal councillors in Canada
Women members of the House of Commons of Canada
Canadian writers of Asian descent
Academic staff of George Brown College
Hong Kong emigrants to Canada
Olivia Chow
Living people
Members of the House of Commons of Canada from Ontario
Members of the United Church of Canada
Naturalized citizens of Canada
New Democratic Party MPs
Spouses of Canadian politicians
Toronto District School Board trustees
Toronto city councillors
University of Guelph alumni
Women in Ontario politics
Writers from Toronto
Canadian women memoirists
21st-century Canadian politicians
Canadian politicians of Chinese descent
21st-century Canadian women politicians
21st-century memoirists